Hugh I (est. 885-930) (fl. early tenth century), called Venator (Latin for the Hunter), was the first Lord of Lusignan. He is mentioned in the Chronicle of Saint-Maixent.  It has been hypothesised that he was the huntsman, ('Le Veneur' in his native French), of either the Count of Poitou or the Bishop of Poitiers on the basis of his epithet. The fact that in later years the Lusignans held the forest from the east of their castle from the Bishop of Poitiers suggest that he held his office from that prelate. He was in turn succeeded by his son, Hugh II Carus  who built the Castle of Lusignan.

Hugh I may be the inspiration of the Raymond of Poitou character in The Romans of Partenay or of Lusignen: Otherwise known as the Tale of Melusine.

Sources
Painter, Sidney. "The Lords of Lusignan in the Eleventh and Twelfth Centuries." Speculum, Vol. 32, No. 1. (Jan., 1957), pp 27–47.

House of Lusignan
10th-century French nobility